Kankanithanthri T. Chitrasiri is a sitting Puisne Justice of the Supreme Court of Sri Lanka who was appointed by President Maithripala Sirisena in 2016 to replace Justice Rohini Marasinghe. He was Justice of the Court of Appeal of Sri Lanka, Judge of the High Court and a Magistrate.

Educated at Dharmasoka College, Ambalangoda and at Royal College, Colombo, he entered the University of Sri Lanka. He would later follow post graduate studies at Queen Mary College, University of London.

Having called to the bar in 1977, he started his practice at the Balapitiya Bar having apprenticed under P. Navaratnarajah Q. He then joined the Legal Draftsman’s Department as an Assistant Legal Draftsman in 1979 and was appointed a judicial officer the year later. He served in the courts of Kandy, Galle, and Panadura. He served as the Chief Magistrate of Colombo and District Judge Colombo. In 2002 he was appointed Judge of the Commercial High Court and held the post till 2009. In 2009 he was appointed as Judge of the Court of Appeal. He had also served as Director, Human Rights Commission and the Registrar of Companies. In an unprecedented move he was appointed to concurrently serve as Commissioner-General of Inland Revenue in 2009.

On 19 November 2015 Chitrasiri was recommended to the Constitutional Council by President Maithripala Sirisena to be appointed as a judge of the Supreme Court of Sri Lanka. On 3 December 2015 Chitrasiri was sworn in as a Justice of the Supreme Court, at the President’s Office in the Parliament Complex.

References

Living people
Sinhalese judges
Sinhalese lawyers
20th-century Sri Lankan people
21st-century Sri Lankan people
Puisne Justices of the Supreme Court of Sri Lanka
Court of Appeal of Sri Lanka judges
Magistrates of Sri Lanka
High Courts of Sri Lanka judges
Alumni of Queen Mary University of London
Alumni of the University of Sri Lanka
Alumni of Sri Lanka Law College
Alumni of Royal College, Colombo
Year of birth missing (living people)